Bayt Hadir is a village in Sanhan District of Sanaa Governorate, Yemen. It is located 13 km east-southeast of Sanaa.

History 
Bayt Hadir was the site of a battle in April or May of 902 (290 AH), between al-Hadi ila'l-Haqq Yahya, the first Imam of Yemen, and the Yu'firid-aligned Al Tarif, led by Ibrahim ibn Khalaf. Al-Hadi had originally set up a camp at the village of Subul, but after he learned that Ibn Khalaf was encamped at nearby Bayt ʽUqab, he became concerned that his position was not secure, so he relocated to Bayt Hadir. The battle took place in two stages, with the Al Tarif defeated both times and forced to retreat. The Ghayat al-amani of Yahya ibn al-Husayn also describes another battle that took place at Bayt Hadir much later, in 1393 (795 AH). It is also the find site of an ancient Hebrew inscription.

References 

Villages in Sanaa Governorate